Matt Dickinson (born 16 November 1968) is an English sports journalist, who is currently chief football correspondent of The Times.

Education 
Dickinson was educated at The Perse School and received a B.A. in Law from Robinson College, Cambridge. Dickinson has also completed a post graduate degree at Cardiff University.

Career 
Dickinson worked for the Cambridge Evening News until he joined the Daily Express in 1991. He joined The Times in 1997. He was appointed football correspondent and, in 1999, conducted an interview with England manager, Glenn Hoddle, which led to his resignation. Hoddle had expressed controversial views on reincarnation and the disabled. Dickinson was made chief football correspondent in 2002. In 2014 his book, "Bobby Moore, The Man in Full", was published.

Awards 
Dickinson was named Young Sports Writer of the Year at the British Sports Journalism Awards in 1993. At the awards in 2000, he was named the Sports Writer of the Year.

References

1968 births
Living people
People educated at The Perse School
Alumni of Robinson College, Cambridge
English male journalists
English sportswriters
The Times journalists
Daily Express people